Yangjiazhuang may refer to the following locations in China:

 Yangjiazhuang, Laiyuan County (杨家庄镇), town in Hebei
 Yangjiazhuang, Fenyang (杨家庄镇), town in Shanxi
 Yangjiazhuang Township, Hebei (杨家庄乡), in Dingzhou
 Yangjiazhuang Township, Shanxi (杨家庄乡), in Jiaoqu, Yangquan